Mitagi (Mitəhi) is a rural locality (a selo) in Derbentsky District, Republic of Dagestan, Russia. The population was 651 as of 2010. There are 9 streets.

Geography 
Mitagi is located 19 km southwest of Derbent (the district's administrative centre) by road. Mitagi-Kazmalyar and Mugarty are the nearest rural localities.

Nationalities 
Azerbaijanis and Tati live there.

References 

Rural localities in Derbentsky District